This article is about the particular significance of the year 1967 to Wales and its people.

Incumbents
Secretary of State for Wales – Cledwyn Hughes
Archbishop of Wales – Edwin Morris, Bishop of Monmouth (retired)
Archdruid of the National Eisteddfod of Wales – E. Gwyndaf Evans

Events
20 February – The first Royal Mail postbus in Britain runs between Llanidloes and Llangurig.
April – Rhodri Morgan marries fellow Welsh Labour MP Julie Edwards.
13 April – Tri-annual county council elections take place across Wales.
5 May – The Brynglas Tunnels on the M4 motorway by-passing Newport are opened.
8 May – Local elections take place across the county boroughs and districts, with the Labour Party losing its majority on Ebbw Vale Urban Council for the first time in 30 years.
27 July – The Welsh Language Act allows the use of Welsh in legal proceedings and official documents.
7 August – Two men and a boy are drowned in the Dyfi estuary.
25–27 August – The Beatles, along with Mick Jagger, Cilla Black, and Jane Asher, come to Bangor to attend a seminar by Maharishi Mahesh Yogi on Transcendental Meditation. Their visit is cut short by the shock news of manager Brian Epstein's death.
2 October – The new Passport Office opens in Newport as part of a United Kingdom government effort to move government offices into the regions.
25 October - Foot and Mouth Disease breaks out in North Wales and parts of England.
November - HM Land Registry opens an office in Swansea.
18 December – Newtown, Montgomeryshire, is designated as a New Town. The River Severn is re-channelled to prevent the town becoming further damaged by floods.
date unknown
The Gittins Report on Primary Education in Wales recommends that "every child should be given sufficient opportunity to be reasonably bilingual by the end of the primary stage".
Merched y Wawr is founded in the village of Parc near Bala, by language campaigner Zonia Bowen, after the Women's Institute refused to allow the Welsh language to be used.
The University of Wales Institute of Science and Technology (UWIST) in Cardiff is incorporated by charter; it later becomes part of the University of Wales.
The former Royal Navy Propellant Factory, Caerwent, RAF Caerwent weapons storage facility, is transferred to United States administration.
The Clywedog Reservoir is completed.
Francis Jones is appointed to the newly-formed Prince of Wales ' Investiture Committee.

Arts and literature
The first Welsh pantomime is put on by Theatr Felinfach, based on the life of Twm Siôn Cati.
Rhys Davies wins an Edgar Allan Poe Award for his story "The Chosen One", originally published in The New Yorker.
The publisher Y Lolfa is established by Robat Gruffudd in Tal-y-bont, Ceredigion.

Awards
National Eisteddfod of Wales (held in Bala)
National Eisteddfod of Wales: Chair – Emrys Roberts, "Y Gwyddonydd"
National Eisteddfod of Wales: Crown – Eluned Phillips, "Corlannau"
National Eisteddfod of Wales: Prose Medal – withheld

New books

English language
Alan Garner – The Owl Service
Bill Meilen – The Division
Leslie Norris – The Loud Winter
Bertrand Russell – War Crimes in Vietnam

Welsh language
Hydwedd Boyer – I'r Ynysoedd
Brinley Richards – Cerddi'r Dyffryn
Kate Roberts – Tegwch y Bore
William Nantlais Williams – O Gopa Bryn Nefo

New drama
Saunders Lewis – Cymru Fydd

Music
Hogia'r Wyddfa – Tylluanod (album)
Mary Hopkin – Mae Pob Awr
Arwel Hughes – Mab y Dyn (cantata)
Jeffrey Lewis – Epitaphium – Children of the Sun
William Mathias – Sinfonietta
Toni ac Aloma – Caffi Gaerwen
Y Triban – Paid â dodi dadi ar y dôl
Y Blew – Maes B

Film
Richard Burton stars in The Taming of the Shrew opposite his wife Elizabeth Taylor.
Carry On up the Khyber is filmed in North Wales.

Broadcasting

Welsh-language television
Hob y Deri Dando; Disc a Dawn

English-language television
Conqueror's Road (drama series)
The Shepherds of Moel Siabod (documentary)
The Prisoner, filmed at Portmeirion
The cast and crew of Doctor Who film the serial The Abominable Snowmen at Nant Ffrancon, doubling for Tibet.

Sport
Boxing – June 15: Howard Winstone is controversially defeated on points by Mexico's Vincente Saldivar at Ninian Park, Cardiff.
Cricket – Glamorgan County Cricket Club moves to a new home at Sophia Gardens, Cardiff.
Cross-country – The 1967 International Cross Country Championships are held at Barry.
Gymnastics – Bobby Williams of Swansea is British champion.
Rugby union – Barry John and Gareth Edwards make their international debut.
Swimming – Paul Radmilovic is the first Briton to be elected to the American Swimming Hall of Fame.
BBC Wales Sports Personality of the Year – Howard Winstone

Births
7 February – Richie Burnett, darts player
16 February – Eluned Morgan, Baroness Morgan of Ely, politician
18 February – Colin Jackson CBE, athlete
22 February – Wayne Curtis, footballer
1 March – Steffan Rhodri, screen actor
21 March – Carwyn Jones, politician
27 March – Bob Morgan, Olympic diver
5 April – Andy Allen, rugby player
8 April – Arwyn Davies, Welsh actor
10 May – Jon Ronson, journalist and documentary filmmaker
9 July
Julie Thomas, lawn bowler
Richard Webster, rugby player
22 July – Rhys Ifans, actor and musician
7 September – Steve James, cricketer
13 October – Steve O'Shaughnessy, footballer
27 October – Jason Gummer, footballer
12 November – Grant Nicholas, musician
18 November – Zoë Skoulding, poet and musician
27 November – Geraint Rees, neurologist
date unknown 
Robert Huw Morgan, organist and choral conductor

Deaths
7 January
Vince Griffiths, rugby player, 65
Sir Frederick Rees, Welsh historian and academic, 83
15 January – Sir Cyril Fox, archaeologist, 84
22 January 
Idris Bell, papyrologist and author, 87
Mary Myfanwy Wood, missionary, 84
28 January – Cliff Davies, Wales international rugby player, 47
2 February – Griffith Griffith, Presbyterian leader, 83
14 February – Gwilym Lloyd George, 1st Viscount Tenby, politician, 70
18 February – Gwynno James, Dean of Brecon, 54
7 March – Percy Morris, trade unionist and politician, 73
11 March
Rupert Davies, Welsh-Canadian author, editor, newspaper publisher, and politician, 87
Ivor Rees, Victoria Cross recipient, 73
26 April – W. J. A. Davies, rugby player, 76
5 May – Owen Thomas Jones, geologist, 89
27 June – David Thomas, educationalist, writer and politician, 86
29 July – Jack Wetter, Wales international rugby union captain, 79
30 July – George Littlewood Hirst, Wales international rugby player, 77
15 September
Rhys Gabe, Wales international rugby union captain, 87
Enid Wyn Jones, nurse, 68
18 September – William Davies, dual-code rugby player, 76
8 October – Vernon Watkins, poet, 61
9 October – Edward Tegla Davies, clergyman and writer, 87
29 October – Bobbie Williams, rugby player, 71?
2 November – Robert John Rowlands ("Meuryn"), poet, 87
25 November – Tom Parker, Welsh international rugby union captain, 76
11 December – Florrie Evans, revivalist and missionary, 82
12 December – Tommy Bamford, footballer, 62
30 December – Ronald Lewis, operatic baritone, 51 (cancer)
31 December – Watkin William Price, historian and activist, 94
date unknown
Len Apsey, footballer, 57
Colin Jones, artist, 38

See also
1967 in Northern Ireland

References

 
Wales